Dark Trooper may refer to:
 Dark Trooper, an enemy in the video game Star Wars: Dark Forces
 Dark Trooper, an Imperial droid in the Star Wars streaming television series The Mandalorian
 Dark Trooper, an enemy in the video game Metroid Prime 2: Echoes

Disambiguation pages